The 1978 Pittsburgh Steelers season was the franchise's 46th season in the National Football League (NFL). The season concluded with the team winning Super Bowl XIII to become the first franchise in the NFL to win three Super Bowl titles.  The championship run was led by quarterback Terry Bradshaw and the team's vaunted Steel Curtain defense. This team is regarded as one of the greatest defensive teams of all time and one of the greatest teams in NFL history. Bradshaw put together the best year of his career to that point, becoming only the second Steeler to win the NFL MVP award.  Ten Steelers players were named to the Pro Bowl team, and four were judged as first-team All-Pros by the AP.  Head coach Chuck Noll returned for his tenth season—moving him ahead of Walt Kiesling as the longest tenured head coach in the team's history to that point.

Their two losses were by a combined 10 points. Despite winning their division, the previous season was a difficult one for the team  (both on and off the field) which culminated in a division round playoff loss to the Denver Broncos on Christmas Eve.

The team began the 1978 season with seven straight victories, a franchise-best start to a season that stood for 42 years, before losing to the Houston Oilers in prime time on Monday Night Football. They finished the season with a league-best 14–2 record, including a 5-game winning streak to close the season. It was also the best record compiled in the team's history (since surpassed only by a 15–1 mark in ).

The 1978 Steelers team was rated the thirty-fifth best team in the history of the NFL (to September 2015) by FiveThirtyEight, a polling aggregation and statistical service. The rating is based upon FiveThirtyEight's proprietary Elo rating system algorithm. Only two Steelers teams were rated higher: the 1975 team at twelfth and the 2005 team one slot ahead of the 1978 team at thirty-fourth.

In 2007, the 1978 Steelers were ranked as the 3rd greatest Super Bowl champions on the NFL Network's documentary series America's Game: The Super Bowl Champions, with team commentary from Rocky Bleier, Mel Blount, Randy Grossman and Joe Greene, and narrated by Bruce Willis. They also were #3 on the 100 greatest teams of all time presented by the NFL on its 100th anniversary. For that, commentary was provided by actor Jon Hamm, radio personality Jon Hein, and players Tony Dungy, Franco Harris, Ed "Too Tall" Jones and Lynn Swann.

Personnel

Staff

Roster

Offseason

League rule changes

The NFL instituted several major changes for the 1978 season.  Chief among these were the extension of the regular season and playoff expansion.  The regular season was extended from 14 to 16 games, with an offsetting decrease in the number of preseason games from six to four.  Two playoff slots were added expanding the field from eight teams to ten, with each conference adding a second wild card entrant.

Additionally, several rules were changed to help open up the offense, particularly the passing game.  One rule which prohibited defenders from contacting receivers more than five yards from the line of scrimmage, came to be known as the "Mel Blount rule" after the Steelers notably physical cornerback.  Another rule allowed offensive linemen to use their hands in blocking.

The rule changes upset coach Noll, who years later said of the teams who supported the changes,

In the end, though, the Steelers were one of the quickest teams to adjust to the new rules; the team's offense benefited more from the changes than the defense was hampered by them.  The rule changes catalyzed the team's transition from a power running game to more of an air attack.

Coaching staff changes
The Steelers coaching staff went through a number of changes after the 1977 season.  Principle among these was the loss of Chuck Noll's top assistant, Bud Carson, who had served as the team's defensive coordinator since .  Carson interviewed for the head coaching vacancy at his alma mater, the University of North Carolina., and was also a candidate for the St. Louis Cardinals top coaching job.  When he didn't land either of those positions he decided to take a job as the defensive backs coach of the Los Angeles Rams.  Defensive line coach George Perles added the defensive coordinator role to his responsibility with the line.

Offensive line coach Dan Radakovich, who had served in that capacity with the Steelers since , resigned to take a position as the defensive coordinator of the San Francisco 49ers.  Radakovich was credited with turning the Pittsburgh Steelers line into one of the league's best.  Rollie Dotsch was hired to replace Radakovich.  Dotsch had recently been let go along with the rest of the Detroit Lions coaching staff.  He had coached the Lions linebackers the previous season.

In the team's final coaching change of the offseason, Dick Walker was hired to coach the defensive backs.  Walker had previously served in a similar role with the New England Patriots.

Roster moves
Several players who played significant roles in the Steelers recent success would not return for 1978.  Among the departed were:
 defensive tackle Ernie Holmes (traded to the Tampa Bay Buccaneers for 10th and 11th round picks in the 1978 draft)
 guard Jim Clack (traded to the New York Giants along with wide receiver Ernie Pough in exchange for offensive lineman John Hicks)
 wide receiver Frank Lewis (traded to the Buffalo Bills for tight end Paul Seymour)
 running back Reggie Harrison (cut)
 safety Jimmy Allen (traded to the Detroit Lions for a fourth-round selection in the 1979 draft)
 safety Glen Edwards (traded to the San Diego Chargers for a 1979 6th rounder).

Several of these moves were made in the name of eliminating "distractions".  Ernie Holmes, Jimmy Allen and Glen Edwards had all had contract disputes which saw them leave the team for brief periods during the previous season.  Holmes, Edwards and Frank Lewis had all lost their starting jobs.  None of the moves brought the Steelers a player who had a significant impact on the team in 1978.

The Frank Lewis trade was a complete flop for the Steelers. Paul Seymour failed his physical when the Steelers learned he'd had surgery on both arches within the past five months.  His rehabilitation from the surgery was not complete and he was unable to run.  Seymour was returned to the Bills who released him, and the two teams failed to work out any other compensation for Lewis.  Lewis was the Steelers first round draft choice in 1971, but was unlikely to have made the Steelers roster anyway due to the ascendancy of John Stallworth opposite Lynn Swann and the training camp performance of the younger Jim Smith and Randy Reutershan.  Lewis did have some football left in him; he made the 1982 Pro Bowl for the Bills.

The Jim Clack trade also netted the Steelers nothing when John Hicks was injured in the pre-season and placed on the injured reserve list.  Meanwhile, both Clack and Ernie Pough made the Giant's 45-man roster, Clack as a starter on the offensive line, where he would be directly involved with that season's Miracle at the Meadowlands between the Giants and Philadelphia Eagles. Longtime Steelers beat writer Ed Bouchette called the Lewis and Clack trades Chuck Noll's "two worst trades in his 23 seasons with the Steelers."

In addition to the players traded away and cut, J. T. Thomas was lost for the season to a blood disorder known as Boeck's Sarcoidosis.  Thomas had been the team's starting left cornerback (opposite Mel Blount) and his loss coupled with the Jimmy Allen trade left the team thin at the cornerback position.

Finally, longtime punter Bobby Walden retired, leaving Rocky Bleier as the last player on the roster who was with the team prior to the arrival of Noll in 1969. Walden, who had turned 40 in the offseason and was the team's oldest player, was replaced by Craig Colquitt, who like Walden would go on to a successful tenure with the team.

Draft

The 1978 NFL Draft was held on May 2–3, in the ballroom of the Roosevelt Hotel in New York City.  The Steelers selected fourteen players.  They also traded their selection in the fifth round (pick 128 overall) to the Green Bay Packers for defensive tackle Dave Pureifory (Pureifory  was later traded during training camp to the New England Patriots for their sixth-round selection in the 1979 draft).  Coming out of the draft it appeared that the team had addressed perceived needs at punter, defensive back, defensive line and running back.

Notes:
pick from St. Louis Cardinals for Marv Kellum
pick from Tampa Bay Buccaneers for Ernie Holmes

"Shouldergate"

The 1978 season began with some controversy, when players were caught wearing shoulder pads in off-season drills in violation of league rules.  The infraction occurred during a late May rookie camp and was uncovered and reported by Pittsburgh Press reporter John Clayton.

Clayton was not the paper's regular Steelers beat writer at the time, but was just filling in that day.  While the practice in which the violation occurred was closed to the media by head coach Chuck Noll, Clayton uncovered the story in interviews with players whom he found wearing pads in the locker room.  Clayton contacted the league office for clarification on the rule, which stated that teams must have "no contact work or use of pads (except helmets) in an off-season training camp."

The story caused an uproar among the team's local fanbase, with most of the vitriol directed at Clayton for reporting the story, rather than at Noll and the team for breaking the rule.  This sentiment was stoked by Noll's angry reaction to the story, in which he referred to the reporting as "espionage."  Even some members of the local media spoke of Clayton as a traitor to the Steeler cause.

The precedent for punishment of such a rule violation was set by an earlier incident for which the Green Bay Packers were stripped of a fourth-round draft pick.  The Packers were able to argue at that time that they were unaware of the rule they broke.  The Steelers had no such defense, since the team's president, Dan Rooney, was instrumental in negotiations to get the "no pads" rule included in the collective bargaining agreement with the league's players.

NFL commissioner Pete Rozelle eventually stripped the Steelers of their third-round selection in the 1979 draft for the transgression.

Training camp
After putting the distractions of the 1977 season and Shouldergate behind them, the Steelers had a very productive training camp in 1978.  All-Pro defensive end Joe Greene noted the renewed focus, saying

Pre-season

The Steelers exhibition schedule did not start off smoothly, despite coming away with a 22–10 victory against the Baltimore Colts.  Starting quarterback Terry Bradshaw suffered a broken nose on a scramble in the first quarter of the game.  In addition, the kicking game was unimpressive and the team committed a considerable number of penalties including three personal fouls.

The second pre-season game against the Atlanta Falcons was the Steelers' lone home exhibition contest. The defensive strength was illustrated in the first quarter when a blocked punt gave the Falcons the ball on the Steelers three-yard line. After failing to gain yardage on two running plays, the Falcons' third-down pass was intercepted by Donnie Shell (one of five Steelers interceptions on the evening). The Falcons' offense was held scoreless, their only points in the 13–7 loss came off a fumble recovery.

The next game, against the New York Giants, was a completely different story.  The game seemed to be over almost before it started when the Giants scored on a 78-yard touchdown pass in just the second play of the evening.  The Giants went on to control the game en route to a 13–6 victory over the listless and mistake-prone Steelers.  Coach Noll said of the opening score, "We didn't recover, and that's not a good sign.  They outdid us all down the line.  They hit harder."

In the fourth and final pre-season game, the Steelers' defense once again played well, but the offense was the weak link in a 16–13 loss to the Dallas Cowboys (in what would turn out to be a preview of the Super Bowl XIII matchup).  The Steelers had difficulty running the ball, with six players combining for just 101 yards on 29 rushing attempts.  Despite the offensive sluggishness, the Steelers led 13–3 after three quarters.  Unfortunately, the defense was worn out (they faced a staggering 82 plays in the game) and they gave up two touchdown passes to Roger Staubach in the fourth quarter.  The lack of offensive rhythm led Terry Bradshaw to comment, "I feel terrible.  I'm concerned.  It's easy to say that it'll come.  But I don't want to go into the Buffalo game worried about the offense.  ... If you looked at this, you'd have to say we have a lot of work to do."

At the end of the preseason, the Steelers were listed by oddsmakers at Harrah's casino in Las Vegas as 5–1 to win the American Football Conference (AFC).  The favorites were the Oakland Raiders at 7–5, followed by the New England Patriots at 3–1 and then the Steelers and Baltimore Colts at 5–1.

Regular season

Schedule

Standings

Game summaries

Week 1: at Buffalo Bills

The Steelers came into the season opener as heavy favorites over the Buffalo Bills.  The Steel Curtain defense was dominant early, holding the Bills to just 59 total yards and only six first downs in first three quarters of play.  New defensive coordinator George Perles employed the blitz to a much greater degree than the team had in the past.  Bills quarterback Joe Ferguson, who was coming off a knee injury suffered in the pre-season, struggled with just three completions and 20 yards on ten passing attempts before being pulled from the game.

Meanwhile, the Steelers scored two second-quarter touchdowns, the first coming on a throw from Terry Bradshaw to John Stallworth.  Stallworth caught three passes of twenty yards or longer in the Steelers first two possessions.  The Steelers second score came on a one-yard plunge by Franco Harris.  When the Steelers scored again on a Sidney Thornton rush at the start of the fourth quarter to go up 21–0, the game appeared to be all but over.

However, Bill Munson came into the game in relief of Ferguson and sparked the Bills to two quick scores that brought the Bills to within 11 points.  The Steelers put the game away with a 73-yard drive capped by Bradshaw's second touchdown of the game.

Week 2: vs. Seattle Seahawks 

This game marked the second ever meeting between the Steelers and the Seattle Seahawks, who were playing in just their third NFL season.  The Seahawks entered the game hoping to stop the Steelers running game – while that effort was largely successful the Steelers and quarterback Terry Bradshaw won with the passing game.  After a scoreless first quarter, the Steelers took a 14–0 lead which they wouldn't relinquish on a pair of Bradshaw touchdown passes.  Linebacker Jack Lambert led the Steelers defense with an interception, a fumble recovery and five solo tackles.

The first quarter saw Bradshaw injure his throwing hand when he jammed his index finger on a helmet.  However, he played through the soreness and threw the two second-quarter scoring passes to Lynn Swann and Sidney Thornton.  The Seahawks scored on a David Sims rushing touchdown to stay within one score at halftime.  The Seahawks caught the Steelers off guard with a successful onside kick following the Sims score, however the subsequent drive ended in a missed field goal.  In the third quarter, the Seahawks narrowed the lead to just four points off an Effren Herrera field goal.

At the start of the fourth quarter Franco Harris, who was hampered in the game by a bruised thigh, was stopped less than a yard short of the goalline on a third down play.  Coach Chuck Noll initially sent the field-goal team on, but after a timeout he reconsidered and sent the offense back out.  Harris ran behind the right guard and pushed the ball across the plane of the goalline before being pushed back.  The play was ruled a touchdown, though the Seahawks disputed the call.

The win gave the Steelers a 2–0 record – a mark they had achieved only once since .

Week 3: at Cincinnati Bengals 

The Steelers entered the third week 2–0 and favored to win, though one sportswriter called the Steelers "convincing but not overpowering", and noted that they had not beaten the point spread in either of their first two games.

The Bengals came into the game without their starting quarterback, Ken Anderson who was nursing a broken finger.  Steelers running back Franco Harris busted through the Bengals 3–4 defense for a 37-yard gain on the game's first offensive play.  Five plays later, Rocky Bleier scored on a 5-yard run and the Steelers never looked back.  The Steelers didn't punt for the first time until the end of the third quarter and they dominated statistically.  Center Mike Webster noted, "From the first play on, everything worked."

The Steelers players were beginning to feel that the team might be once again approaching the level of the Super Bowl teams.  Bleier said after the game, "At some point, I don't know when, people are going to start saying, 'Hey, it's the Steelers again.'"  When asked about his performance through the first three games, Bradshaw admitted he was playing the best football of his life, saying, "Yes and I don't know why, but I don't even want to find out. Whatever it is, maybe, it'll last all year. Maybe it will be one of those dream years people have been wantin' me to have."  Linebacker Jack Lambert stated, "We're playing well and we've got a good attitude. Last year was no good.  This is good."

Coach Noll tried to tamp down expectations, saying "We're happy to be there. We'll take any kind of crumbs we can get."  But even he had to admit that, "It was a good day for us."  He added, "Our football team is functioning with a pretty good concept of what it's all about, what it takes. Things aren't out of perspective at all."

The 3–0 start to the season was only the third in the franchise's history and they stood tied atop the AFC Central division with the Cleveland Browns.

Week 4: vs. Cleveland Browns 

The Steelers and Browns came into their week four matchup tied atop the AFC Central standings, but Cleveland was without their four-time Pro Bowl running back Greg Pruitt who had been hospitalized by a leg contusion. The Browns had never previously won in the two teams' eight previous meetings in Three Rivers Stadium. Coach Noll predicted, however, that the Browns would remain competitive without Pruitt, going so far as to say that the game "is their Super Bowl."

The Browns contained the Steelers offense all game, and after four quarters the game was tied at 9 with neither team managing to score a touchdown in regulation. The Browns had two apparent scores nullified by penalty: a 61-yard touchdown pass in the first quarter was called back when it was ruled that Browns quarterback Brian Sipe had crossed the line of scrimmage prior to releasing the ball and later a 17-yard pass was nullified by a holding penalty. A Hail Mary attempt by the Browns on the final play of the fourth quarter was intercepted by Steelers defensive back Tony Dungy.

The Steelers won the overtime coin toss and chose to receive the kickoff. On the kickoff, Steelers returner Larry Anderson lost the ball as he was being tackled. While the Browns felt that Anderson had fumbled (and replays later showed that it probably was a fumble), the officials ruled that Anderson was down and the play had been whistled dead before he lost the ball. Steelers retained possession at their 21-yard line. A few plays later, the Steelers were forced into a fourth down situation just over mid-field with 1 yard to go. Coach Noll chose to go for the conversion, which was gained by a short Franco Harris run. When asked about the decision Noll said, "It wasn't that much of a gamble, especially when the players had such a strong conviction of going for it – when you want something you try that much harder to attain your goal."

A few plays after the fourth-down conversion, a Steelers trick play turned out to be the game's final decisive play. On the play, Terry Bradshaw handed off to running back Rocky Bleier who gave the ball to wide receiver Lynn Swann on an apparent reverse. Swann, however, pitched the ball back to quarterback Terry Bradshaw who completed a 37-yard pass to tight end Bennie Cunningham for the decisive touchdown. Coach Noll revealed after the game that the flea flicker was actually a part of the team's specific game-plan for the Browns saying, "It was called high school right. We resurrected it this week and worked on it Wednesday and Thursday in practice."

Week 5: at New York Jets 

The win brought the Steelers to 5–0 which was the best start to a season in the franchise's history.

Week 6: vs. Atlanta Falcons

Week 7: at Cleveland Browns

Week 8: vs. Houston Oilers

Week 9: vs. Kansas City Chiefs

Week 10: vs. New Orleans Saints

Week 11: at Los Angeles Rams

Week 12: vs. Cincinnati Bengals

Week 13: at San Francisco 49ers

Week 14: at Houston Oilers

Week 15: vs. Baltimore Colts

Week 16: at Denver Broncos

Stats

Passing

Rushing

Receiving

Kicking

Punting

Kick Return

Punt Return

Defense & Fumbles

Scoring Summary

Team

Quarter-by-quarter

Playoffs

Schedule

Game summaries

AFC Divisional Playoff: vs. Denver Broncos

AFC Championship: vs. Houston Oilers

On a wet, slick, and slippery field, the Steelers dominated the Oilers by forcing 9 turnovers and only allowing 5 points. Pittsburgh took the early lead by driving 57 yards to score on running back Franco Harris' 7-yard touchdown run. Then, linebacker Jack Ham recovered a fumble at the Houston 17-yard line, which led to running back Rocky Bleier's 15-yard rushing touchdown.

In the second quarter, a 19-yard field goal by Oilers kicker Toni Fritsch cut the score 14–3, but then the Steelers scored 17 points during the last 48 seconds of the second quarter. First, Houston running back Ronnie Coleman lost a fumble, and moments later Pittsburgh wide receiver Lynn Swann caught a 29-yard touchdown reception. Then Johnnie Dirden fumbled the ensuing kickoff, which led to Steelers wide receiver John Stallworth's 17-yard reception. After the Oilers got the ball back, Coleman fumbled again, and Roy Gerela kicked a field goal to increase Pittsburgh's lead, 31–3. Houston would never pose a threat for the rest of the game as they turned over the ball 4 times in their 6 second-half possessions.

Super Bowl XIII: vs. Dallas Cowboys

The  Steelers made a comeback in the Super Bowl winning 35-31

Personnel

Players

Management & Coaches

Awards, honors, and records
Several Steelers players received individual honors in recognition of their play during the 1978 season.  Terry Bradshaw swept the season's Most Valuable Player (MVP) recognition, earning both the regular season and Super Bowl honors as well as the team's internal MVP award.  The team led the league with ten players selected to the 1979 Pro Bowl (a full quarter of the 40-player AFC squad).  Among the Pro Bowlers were three offensive and two defensive starters.  Eight Steeler performers were recognized as All-NFL by various publications and four others made All-Conference squads.

Pro Bowl Selections
The following players were selected to represent the AFC in the Pro Bowl.  The team was selected on the basis of ballots submitted by each of the conference's 14 head coaches as well as a consensus of voting by each team's players.

Starters:
 QB Terry Bradshaw (second Pro Bowl)
 WR Lynn Swann (third)
 C Mike Webster (first)
 DT Joe Greene (ninth)
 LB Jack Ham (sixth)

Reserves:
 RB Franco Harris (seventh)
 DE L. C. Greenwood (fifth)
 LB Jack Lambert (fourth)
 S Donnie Shell (first)
 CB Mel Blount (third)

Mike Wagner was originally announced as the reserve safety, but an error in the tabulation of the ballots was uncovered and Donnie Shell was named to the team instead.

All-Pro Selections
The following players were named to All-NFL or All-Conference squads designated by one or more of several publications and groups who identified the players judged to be the top performers of the 1978 season.

Individual honors and achievements
 Terry Bradshaw, Steelers MVP (selected by a vote of the team's players)
 Bradshaw, Associated Press NFL Most Valuable Player (MVP) award
 Bradshaw, Super Bowl MVP
 Bradshaw, Bert Bell Award
 Bradshaw led league in touchdown passes (28).
 Bradshaw tied with Dan Fouts to lead league in yards per pass attempt (7.9 yds) .

Team achievements/records
 Fewest points scored against in league (195 points).
 Surrendered zero first-quarter touchdowns in the regular season.

See also
 History of the Pittsburgh Steelers
 List of Pittsburgh Steelers seasons
 List of Super Bowl champions

References

External links
 1978 Pittsburgh Steelers season at Profootballreference.com 
 1978 Pittsburgh Steelers season statistics at jt-sw.com 
 Steelers' 1978 at NFL.com 
 1978: A Look Back (from Steelers Digest), pg 1, pg 2, pg 3, pg 4, pg 5, pg 6, pg 7
 SI.com – Sports Illustrated Covers – October 9, 1978
 SI.com – Sports Illustrated Covers – January 15, 1979
 SI.com – Sports Illustrated Covers – January 29, 1979
 America's Game: 1978 Pittsburgh Steelers from NFL Films (via Hulu)

Pittsburgh Steelers seasons
American Football Conference championship seasons
Super Bowl champion seasons
Pittsburgh Steelers
AFC Central championship seasons
Pittsburgh Steel